Eugene F. "Bud" Reid (28 September 1926 – 2 October 2005) was a notable official of the Boy Scouts of America and Chairman of the World Scout Committee.

After serving in the US Navy during World War II, he worked in the oil and gas sectors as a geologist.

Background
He was President of the World Jamboree Committee Chairman in 1978-1979, traveling to Australia, Egypt, Ireland, Senegal and Thailand. He then chaired the World Scout Committee from 1990 to 1993, meeting with Pope John Paul II on this occasion.

Reid was awarded the Bronze Wolf, the only distinction of the World Organization of the Scout Movement, awarded by the World Scout Committee for exceptional services to world Scouting. He was also a 1988 recipient of the Silver Buffalo Award.

Further reading 
Dr. László Nagy, 250 Million Scouts, The World Scout Foundation and Dartnell Publishers, 1985, complete list through 1981, from which the French Scoutopedia article is sourced

References

External links

 

 

Recipients of the Bronze Wolf Award
2005 deaths
1926 births
World Scout Committee members